This is a list of Danish television related events from 1997.

Events
1 March - Kølig Kaj is selected to represent Denmark at the 1997 Eurovision Song Contest with his song "Stemmen i mit liv". He is selected to be the twenty-seventh Danish Eurovision entry during Dansk Melodi Grand Prix held at the DR Studios in Copenhagen.

Debuts

Domestic
14 September - Taxa (DR1) (1997-1999)
Strisser på Samsø (TV2) (1997-1998)

International
 Teletubbies (TV2)

Television shows

Ending this year

Births

Deaths

See also
1997 in Denmark